Vallejo is an American rock band founded by three Vallejo brothers: AJ Vallejo (eldest twin), Alex Vallejo (younger twin) & Omar Vallejo (youngest brother) (in Austin, Texas, but born & raised in El Campo, Texas later moving to Alabaster, Alabama, a suburb of Birmingham, Alabama during their pre-teen years. The band has released 12 full-length albums starting back in 1991 with their self-titled debut 'Sins' on the now-defunct Birmingham, AL indie label, Chapel Lane.

After their move to Austin, TX January of 1995 the group performed at Austin's legendary Steamboat's Wednesday weekly residency for a full year writing and recording what would become their first major label release 1997's Shining Sun after being signed to TVT Records during a SXSW showcase. The album gained rave reviews kicking open many doors for Vallejo who went on to tour nationwide becoming a 'dangerous live act' as described by AustinLive. Beautiful Life was released a year later in 1998, also on the TVT label to less reaction as a result of TVT deciding not to exercise their obligation to promote Beautiful Life, most likely due to the timid reaction of the album's first single, a strange artistic decision pushed by the label to pair the band with the Beastie Boys' DJ Hurricane. Bittersweet perhaps that this single, 'Snake In The Grass' would later resurface a decade later on two episodes of HBO's hit-series True Blood to much renewed airplay worldwide.

After catching a High End Lighting showcase in Orlando, Florida by Vallejo at the House of Blues, Miami producer Emilio Estefan immediately signs Vallejo releasing Into the New, released by Sony in 2000. The album garnered mixed reviews but did well on the Rock Charts getting the band invited on nationwide US tours by Stone Temple Pilots, Linkin Park, Fuel, Disturbed, Blues Traveler, Matchbox Twenty, The Black Crowes. Prior to releasing their second single to national radio, an unfortunate one-two knock out combo of bad luck catches up to Vallejo with a complete label-heads change at Sony and weeks later the world-stopping distraction of 9/11. Sony cuts half of the artist roster with Vallejo on the list halfway into their summer tour. The weary brothers and band honor their remaining dates, head home strung out and drained spending over a year tangled in legal battles.

In 2002, as free agents, Vallejo launches their own label VMG and releases Stereo, to overwhelming positive reviews becoming what many know to be as the Vallejo fan favorite. Over the next decade, the band continues releasing a healthy offering of albums to their loyal fanbase: 2004's trilogy-archive-releases: Black Sky, Leftovers, and Steamboat Live 97, Acousta (2006), Thicker Than Water (2008) and Brothers Brew (2014). Shortly after the release of Brothers Brew sources of the band mention artistic differences and/or a bit of inevitable burnout from two decades of non-stop touring becoming the main reason for the Vallejo brothers' gradual transition from touring artists to producers with a seemingly effective presence in the music industry. AJ Vallejo goes on to win Austin Chronicle's Guitar Player of the Year in 2016 and Producer of the Year three years in a row in 2014-2015-2016, launching indie label 10X Music Group and continues with both Bruce Castleberry on guitar and Alex Geismar on drums as roots-rock group, Brodie Lane. Alex Vallejo becomes director of Austin's School of Rock facilities, co-producer at EPS and Manager at Austin Music Foundation. Omar Vallejo opens 512 Studios in Austin, TX winning Austin Chronicle's Producer and Studio of the Year in 2018-2019. 

In 2021, after a seven year recording hiatus, Vallejo releases Amigos on their VMG label, an album composed of collaborations with Texas staples and Grammy artist including Flaco Jimenez, Ray Benson, Dale Watson, Grupo Fantasma, and Gina Chavez to name a few.

Members

Current members
A.J. Vallejo – Lead Vocals/Guitar
Alejandro Vallejo – drums
Omar Vallejo – Bass guitar/backing vocals
Bruce Castleberry – Guitar/backing vocals
Alex Geismar – percussion/backing vocals

Former members
Michael Panepanto – percussion
Steve Ramos – percussion
James "Diego" Simmons – percussion
Heath Clark – Guitar
Jeff Hartsough – percussion
Angel Ferrer – Guitar
Zach Baker – Guitar

Discography

Studio albums

EP

Non-album tracks

See also
Music of Austin

External links
 

Rock music groups from Alabama
Musical groups from Austin, Texas
Musical groups established in 1994
1994 establishments in Texas
550 Music artists
Rock music groups from Texas